The Continuous Ministry or Continuous Cabinet was an informal designation for two nineteenth century colonial governments: 

 The Continuous Ministry of Queensland, from 1890 to 1899.
 The Continuous Ministry of New Zealand, in 1876, from 1880 to 1883 and 1887 to 1890.